Egidijus is a Lithuanian masculine given name. It is a cognate of the English language name Giles.

List of people named Egidijus
Egidijus Balčiūnas (born  1975),  Lithuanian sprint canoer
Egidijus Bičkauskas (born 1955), Lithuanian politician, jurist
Egidijus Dimša (born 1985), Lithuanian basketball player
Egidijus Jarašiūnas (born  1952), Lithuanian lawyer
Egidijus Juška (born 1975), Lithuanian footballer
Egidijus Kavaliauskas (born 1988), Lithuanian boxer who competed in the 2008 Olympics 
Egidijus Klumbys (born  1952), Lithuanian politician
Egidijus Kūris (born 1961), Lithuanian professor and PhD in law 
Egidijus Majus (born 1984),  Lithuanian footballer currently playing for PFK Dinamo Samarqand
Egidijus Mockevičius (born 1992), Lithuanian basketball player
Egidijus Vaitkūnas (born 1988), Lithuanian footballer 
Egidijus Valavičius (born  1978), Lithuanian mixed martial artist from Vilnius 
Egidijus Varnas (born 1975),  Lithuanian football forward currently playing for FK Ekranas 
Egidijus Žilinskas (born  1986), Lithuanian judoka 

Lithuanian masculine given names